Natalia Mikhailovna Dudinskaya (in Kharkiv – 29 January 2003, in Saint Petersburg) was a Soviet prima ballerina who dominated the Kirov Ballet from the 1930s to the 1950s.

Dudinskaya's mother was Natalia Tagliori, a ballerina who had been coached by Enrico Cecchetti. Trained by Agrippina Vaganova, Dudinskaya matriculated from her school in 1931. She danced all the classical leads at the Kirov Theatre including the starring role in Cinderella. She later originated leading roles in Boris Asafyev's Flames of Paris and Taras Bulba. She was best known in La Bayadère, Don Quixote and in the title role of the eponymous Laurencia, which she originated. She was frequently partnered by her husband, Konstantin Sergeyev, famed Georgian dancer Vakhtang Chabukiani and, at the end of her career, a 21-year-old Rudolf Nureyev who she picked to partner her in Laurencia. Frail health forced her to retire in 1961. She did, however dance in her husband's 1964 film version of Sleeping Beauty in the role of Carabosse. During her career, she received a total of four Stalin Prizes. In 1957, she was named a People's Artist of the USSR.

Upon her retirement, Dudinskaya became the ballet mistress of the Kirov Ballet and one of the most famed teachers at the Vaganova Institute. After Nureyev's defection to the West in 1961, she and her husband, Konstantin Sergeyev, were subjected to reprimands from Soviet officials. They ultimately lost their company positions after the defection of Natalia Makarova in 1970 but Dudinskaya continued to teach up and coming dancers. Anastasia Volochkova and Ulyana Lopatkina were among the last ballerinas coached by her. Dudinskaya also helped her husband stage his productions of Russian classics outside Russia, turning up at the Boston Ballet, for example, in the 1980s and 1990s to work on Giselle, Swan Lake, La Bayadère and Le Corsaire. She died in 2003 at the age of 90.

References
Movsheson A.G. Natalia Mikhailovna Dudinskaya. Leningrad, 1951.
G. Kremshevskaya. Natalya Dudinskaya. Leningrad-Moscow, 1964.

External links
Website about Dudinskaya
Photogallery

1912 births
2003 deaths
Dancers from Kharkiv
People from Kharkovsky Uyezd
Prima ballerinas
Soviet ballerinas
People's Artists of the USSR
People's Artists of the RSFSR
Stalin Prize winners
Recipients of the Order of Lenin
Recipients of the Order of the Red Banner of Labour
Recipients of the Order of Friendship of Peoples